The IAFL College Bowl was a college football tournament that formed part of the Irish American Football League between 2007 and 2011. Four teams competed in the championship since its inauguration: the UL Vikings, the DCU Saints, Trinity College, and UCD. The final champions were Trinity College, having defeating UCD 7-0 in December 2011.

The Bowl was discontinued after the 2011 edition as all four collegiate members of the league now compete in the South division of the Shamrock Bowl Conference.

History 
Initially, the championship was a single game which formed part of the 2007 and 2008 IAFL seasons. The UL Vikings were twice victorious, defeating the DCU Saints by scores of 50-2 and 47-12. In 2009, the Championship became a four-team tournament with the addition of Trinity College and UCD. The Vikings were again successful, defeating the Saints in the final.

In 2010, Trinity College captured the Championship for the first time in spectacular fashion. Facing the UL Vikings in Limerick, the game finished 12-6 after triple overtime (7 quarters) and 3 hours and 45 minutes of play; an IAFL record for match length. The victory was sealed in the third quarter of overtime with a touchdown from Rob McDowell. Linebacker Stephen Carton was named game MVP. The club retained their title in 2011, defeating UCD by a margin of 7-0.

Results

References

External links 
 IAFL official website

Irish American Football League
2007 establishments in Ireland
2011 disestablishments in Ireland
Recurring sporting events established in 2007
Recurring sporting events disestablished in 2011